Merca District is a district of the southeastern Lower Shebelle (Shabeellaha Hoose) region in Somalia. Its capital lies at Merca.

References

External links
 Districts of Somalia
 Administrative map of Merca District

Districts of Somalia